The 1995 Iowa Barnstormers season was the first season for the Iowa Barnstormers. They finished the 1995 Arena Football League season 7–5 and ended the season with a loss in the semifinals of the playoffs against the Orlando Predators.

Schedule

Regular season

Playoffs
The Barnstormers were awarded the No. 5 seed in the AFL playoffs.

Standings

Awards

References

Iowa Barnstormers seasons
1995 Arena Football League season
Iowa Barnstormers Season, 1995